Chaim HaKohen  of Aram Zobah (Aleppo) (Egypt 1585- Italy 1655) was an Egyptian Rabbi.

Early life 
His father was Rabbi Abraham HaKohen, who belonged to a famous family of Kohanim, descendants of Yosef HaCohen from Spain. 

As a child, while his classmates spent their free time playing, Chaim went to the synagogue to study Torah, and to learn how to serve G-d. As a teenager, on Shabbat, he would climb into the pulpit and give sermons on the Torah portion (the parashah), on the laws related to Jewish festivities, and give on Musar (Jewish ethics).

Career 
After becoming a Rabbi, HaKohen moved to the city of Safed. There he studied with the rabbi and kabbalist Chaim Vital for three years. From Safed, HaKohen moved to Aram Tsoba, located near Aleppo, Syria, where he settled permanently. He was elected rabbi, replacing Mordechai HaKohen, son-in-law of Shmuel Laniado (Baal HaKelim).

Under Rabbi HaKohen Torah study flourished, even more than in Aleppo. New Talmudic schools and academies were established, and more benches were added to the synagogue. 

HaKohen served the Aleppo community as rabbi and head of the rabbinical court for decades. With exhaustive knowledge, he answered complex rabbinical questions, sometimes sent by members of distant Jewish communities. Eventually, he decided to organize his writings and publish books, especially his commentaries on Shulchan Aruch, the legal code that was written by his teacher's teacher, rabbi and kabbalist Joseph Karo.

Rabbi HaKohen wrote many other works. These include his commentaries on the Song of Songs (Shir HaShirim), the Book of Lamentations, the Book of Ruth, the Book of Daniel, and many other manuscripts. The printing press had not yet arrived in Aleppo and books were reproduced by hand. The best printers of the time were in Venice, Italy, where half of European books were published during most of the 16th century. The first edition of the Babylonian Talmud was printed there, along with the first edition of Shulchan Aruch, by the rabbi and kabbalist Joseph Karo.

Rabbi HaKohen sent his commentary on the Book of Esther to Venice. As time passed and the book did not appear, Rabbi HaKohen decided to travel to Venice, and personally oversee its printing. Together with his son they traveled by sea carrying all the Rabbi's manuscripts. His ship was attacked by Maltese pirates. As the pirates boarded the ship, HaKohen and his son jumped into the sea, but their books remained on the ship.

The rabbi prayed to G-d, and asked him for help to retrieve his valuable books, or to help him write them again by heart. G-d granted the second request. Rabbi HaKohen spent several years in Italy, rewriting his lost books. The first book that he was able to print, with the help of Moses Zacuto, was entitled Torat Chacham (The Teaching of the Wise). This book was a collection of the rabbi's sermons on the weekly sections of the Torah. The book was published in Venice in 1654.

His next book was Mekor Chaim (The Source of Life). This book is a commentary of Shulchan Aruch, consisting of several volumes. The first volumes were published in Venice, also in 1654. To print the second volume of his book Pitda, the rabbi travelled to Livorno, Italy, where he died in 1655. After his death, some of his pirated books were recovered.

Legacy 
Rabbi Yosef Jaim David Azulai (Hida), in his chronicle book Shem HaGuedolim, states that he had in his hands HaKohen's manuscript Ateret Zahab, a commentary on the Book of Esther. Migdal David, a commentary on the Book of Ruth, was also found. The book was printed in Amsterdam in 1680 by an impostor who falsely claimed authorship. The Talmudic commentaries on the Berachot treatise were published in the Israeli monthly publication Qobets Bet Aharon ve Israel, in 1983. Some of HaKohen's books and commentaries exist as manuscripts and remain unpublished.

References 

1585 births
1655 deaths
HaKohen, Chaim
Egyptian Sephardi Jews
Sephardi rabbis in Ottoman Syria
Kabbalists